Lake Forest High School is a public high school in an unincorporated area of Kent County with a Felton postal address. It is a part of the Lake Forest School District.

The school services Bowers, Felton, Harrington, Viola, most of Riverview, most of Frederica, and some of Woodside East.

It is a small Division II Henlopen Conference School.

References

External links
 

High schools in Kent County, Delaware
Public high schools in Delaware